Evelyn Louise Keyes (November 20, 1916 – July 4, 2008) was an American film actress. She is best known for her role as Suellen O'Hara in the 1939 film Gone with the Wind.

Early life
Evelyn Keyes was born in Port Arthur, Texas, to Omar Dow Keyes and Maude Ollive Keyes, the daughter of a Methodist minister. After Omar Keyes died when she was three years old, Keyes moved with her mother to Atlanta, Georgia, where they lived with her grandparents. As a teenager, Keyes took dancing lessons and performed for local clubs such as the Daughters of the Confederacy.

Film career
A chorus girl by age 18, Keyes came out to Hollywood and was introduced to Cecil B. DeMille who in her own words “signed me to a personal contract without even making a test”. After a handful of B movies at Paramount Pictures, she landed a minor role in Gone with the Wind (1939), that of Scarlett O'Hara's sister Suellen. (She was later interviewed for the 1988 documentary The Making of a Legend: Gone with the Wind.)

Columbia Pictures signed her to a contract. In 1941, she played an ingenue in Here Comes Mr. Jordan. She spent most of the early 1940s playing leads in many of Columbia's B dramas and mysteries. She appeared as the female lead opposite Larry Parks in Columbia's blockbuster hit The Jolson Story (1946). She followed this up with an enjoyable minor screwball comedy, The Mating of Millie, with Glenn Ford. She was then in a 1949 role as Kathy Flannigan in Mrs. Mike. Keyes' last role in a major film was a small part as Tom Ewell's vacationing wife in The Seven Year Itch (1955), which starred Marilyn Monroe. Keyes officially retired in 1956, but continued to act.

Personal life
She was married to Barton Oliver Bainbridge Sr. from 1938 until his death from suicide in 1940. Later, she married and divorced director Charles Vidor (1943–1945), actor/director John Huston (23 July 1946 – February 1950), and bandleader Artie Shaw (1957–1985). Keyes said of her many love affairs: "I always took up with the man of the moment and there were many such moments." While married to Huston, the couple adopted a Mexican child, Pablo, whom Huston had discovered while filming on location in Mexico for The Treasure of the Sierra Madre.

Her autobiography Scarlett O'Hara's Younger Sister: My Lively Life In and Out of Hollywood was published in 1977. Keyes expressed her opinion that Mrs. Mike was her best film. She also wrote of the personal cost she paid by having an abortion just before Gone with the Wind was to begin filming, as the experience left her unable to have children. Among her many love affairs in Hollywood she recounted in Scarlett O'Hara's Younger Sister, were those with film producer Michael Todd (who left Evelyn for Elizabeth Taylor), actors Glenn Ford, Sterling Hayden, Dick Powell, Anthony Quinn, David Niven and Kirk Douglas. She had to regularly fend off Columbia Pictures studio head Harry Cohn's advances during her career at the studio.

Keyes died on July 4, 2008 from uterine cancer at the Pepper Estates in Montecito, California. She was cremated with her ashes being divided among her relatives with the remaining half sent to Lamar University in Port Arthur, Texas and the last of the cremated remains being buried with her relatives in the family plot at The Waco Baptist Church Cemetery, Waco, Georgia, with a small tombstone with the epitaph Gone with the Wind, where her ashes were buried in October 2008.

Filmography 

Excluding appearances as herself.

Film

Television

Bibliography

References

External links

 Evelyn Keyes, Actress in 'Gone with the Wind' dies at 91
 New York Times Biography
 
 
 Photos of Evelyn Keyes in 'The Jolson Story' 1946 by Ned Scott

1916 births
2008 deaths
Methodists from Georgia (U.S. state)
American film actresses
Deaths from cancer in California
People with Alzheimer's disease
Deaths from uterine cancer
People from Port Arthur, Texas
People from Greater Los Angeles
Actresses from Texas
Actresses from Georgia (U.S. state)
Actresses from Atlanta
20th-century American actresses
Columbia Pictures contract players
Huston family
California Democrats
Georgia (U.S. state) Democrats
Texas Democrats
People from Montecito, California